Wapsie is a unincorporated community in Franklin Township in Bremer County, Iowa, United States.

History

Wapsie was founded one mile west of the banks of the Wapsipinicon River.
The Wapsie post office opened on October 10, 1890, and closed on January 14, 1905.

Wapsie's population was 25 in 1887, was 27 in 1902, and was 21 in 1917.

The community of Wapsie in Bremer County is not to be confused with the town of Bailey, formerly known as Wapsie, in Mitchell County; both communities were near the Wapsipinicon River, but in different parts of the state.

References

External links
Map of Bremer County, Iowa, including Wapsie

Unincorporated communities in Bremer County, Iowa